Price is a male given name which may refer to:

 Price Cobb (born 1954), American racecar driver
 Price Daniel (1910-1988), US Senator and 38th Governor of Texas
 Price Daniel Jr. (1941-1981), American politician, Speaker of the Texas House of Representatives from 1973 to 1975 
 Price Ellison (1852–1932), English-born Canadian politician
 Price Hartstonge (1692–1743), Anglo-Irish politician who sat in the Irish House of Commons

Masculine given names